is a town located in Fukushima Prefecture, Japan. In 2017, Mishima was selected as one of The Most Beautiful Villages in Japan.

Geography

Mishima is located in the western portion of the Aizu region of Fukushima Prefecture. Most of the town is covered with forests. Traffic is concentrated along the Tadami River in the northern part of the town, and the main functions of the town such as government offices and hospitals are located in the Miyashita area. Miyashita Dam is located slightly upstream, and there is a hydroelectric power plant using the dam. The town has a number of hot springs.

Mountains: Mount Takamori
Rivers: Tadami River
Lakes: Miyashita Dam

Neighboring municipalities
Fukushima Prefecture
Kaneyama
Shōwa
Yanaizu

Climate
Mishima has a humid continental climate/oceanic climate (Köppen Dfb/Cfb) characterized by warm summers and cold winters with heavy snowfall.

Demographics
Per Japanese census data, the population of Mishima has declined steadily over the past 70 years.

History
The area of present-day Mishima was part of ancient Mutsu Province and formed part of the holdings of Aizu Domain during the Edo period. After the Meiji Restoration, it was organized as part of Ōnuma District in Fukushima Prefecture. Mishima village was founded on July 1, 1955 through a merger of the villages of Miyashita and Nishikata. It was raised to town status on April 1, 1961.

Economy
Hydroelectric power generation from numerous dams on the Tadami River is the primary source of revenue for the town, along with forestry and wood products.

Education
Mishima has one public elementary school and one public junior high school operated by the town government. The town does not have a high school.
 Mishima Town Mishima Middle School
 Mishima Town Mishima Elementary School

Transportation

Railway
 JR East – Tadami Line
  -  -  -

Highway

Local attractions
Mishima Sai-no-kami Festival, a National Intangible Cultural Property

References

External links

Official Website 

 
Towns in Fukushima Prefecture